Haviland can refer to:

People
 Aslaug Haviland (1913–2003), deaf and blind Norwegian woman and motivational speaker
 Chris Haviland (born 1952), Australian politician
 David B. Haviland (born 1961), Swedish-American physicist
 Edna Haviland (1896-1981), Canadian chemist
 Frank Burty Haviland (1886–1971), French Cubist painter
 George Darby Haviland (1857-1901), British surgeon and naturalist
 James W. Haviland (1911-2007), American doctor and specialist in Internal Medicine
 John Haviland, professor of Linguistics and Anthropology
 John Haviland (physician) (1785–1851), professor of medicine at Cambridge
 John Kenneth Haviland, American pilot who flew for the Royal Air Force during the Battle of Britain
 Laura Smith Haviland (1808–1898), American abolitionist, suffragette and social reformer
 Mike Haviland (born 1967), American ice hockey coach
 Paul Haviland (1880–1950), French-American photographer, writer and arts critic
 Stanley Haviland (1899–1972), Australian public servant
 Thomas Heath Haviland Sr. (1795 or 1796–1867), English-born landowner, banker and political figure in Prince Edward Island
 Thomas Heath Haviland (1822–1895), Canadian lawyer, politician and father of Canadian Confederation
 Virginia Haviland, author and Library of Congress librarian
 William Haviland (1718–1784), Irish-born general in the British Army
 Willis Bradley Haviland (1890–1944), a member of the Lafayette Escadrille, first pilot to launch a plane from a battleship
 Haviland Morris (born 1959), American actress
 Haviland Routh (1871–1959), Canadian ice hockey player
 Haviland Smith, retired CIA station chief

Places in the United States
 Haviland, Kansas, a city
 Haviland Crater, an astrobleme
 Haviland, New York, a community and census-designated place
 Haviland, Ohio, a village

Things
 Haviland, a mark of Necco, a candy company
 Haviland & Co., a manufacturer of Limoges porcelain in France

See also

 
 de Havilland (disambiguation)